Volli Station was a railway station along the Bergen Line.  It is located at Volli in the Raundalen valley in the municipality of Voss in Vestland county, Norway. The station was served by the Bergen Commuter Rail, operated by Norges Statsbaner, with up to five daily departures in each direction. The station was opened in 1936 and closed in December 2012.

External links
 Jernbaneverket's page on Volli

Railway stations in Voss
Railway stations on Bergensbanen
Railway stations opened in 1936